Michel Pastoureau (born 17 June 1947) is a French professor of medieval history and an expert in Western symbology.

Biography
Pastoureau was born in Paris on 17 June 1947. He studied at the École Nationale des Chartes, a college for prospective archivists and librarians. After writing his 1972 thesis about heraldic bestiaries in the Middle Ages, he worked in the coins, medals and antiquities department of the Bibliothèque nationale de France until 1982.

Since 1983 he has held the Chair of History of Western Symbolism (Chaire d'histoire de la symbolique occidentale) and is a director of studies at the Sorbonne's École pratique des hautes études. He is an academician of the Académie internationale d'héraldique (International Academy of Heraldry) and vice-president of the Société française d'héraldique (French Heraldry Society). When he received an honorary doctorate from the University of Lausanne in 1996, he was described as an eminent scholar who has made a radical contribution to several disciplines.

Professor Pastoureau has published widely, including work on the history of colours, animals, symbols, and the knights of the Round Table. He has also written on emblems and heraldry, as well as sigillography and numismatics.

Works

 Vert. Histoire d'une couleur. Éditions du Seuil, Paris 2013, .
 L'ours. Histoire d'un roi déchu, éditions du Seuil, 2007
 Les chevaliers de la Table ronde, éditions du Gui, 2006, 
 Une histoire symbolique du Moyen Âge occidental, Seuil, La librairie du XXIe siècle, Paris, 2004,  (Trad. esp.: Una historia simbólica de la Edad Media occidental, Buenos Aires/Madrid, Katz editores S.A, 2006)
 Traité d'héraldique (Col. Grands manuels Picard). Paris: Picard éditeur, 1st. 1979 (2nd. ed. 1993; 3rd, 1997; 4th. 2003, revised and augmented; 5th ed. 2008). The 4th ed. [] added a Part IV, entitled "Quinze ans de recherches Héraldiques" where a state-of-the-art is attempted and three case-studies are presented. 
 Bleu: Histoire d'une couleur, éditions du Seuil, 2000
 Les animaux célèbres, Bonneton, 2001
 Les emblèmes de la France, éditions Bonneton, Paris, 1998
 Jésus chez le teinturier: couleurs et teintures dans l'Occident médiéval, Le Léopard d'or, Paris, 1997, 
 Figures de l'héraldique, collection « Découvertes Gallimard » (nº 284), série Traditions. Éditions Gallimard, 1996, 
 UK edition – Heraldry: Its Origins and Meaning, 'New Horizons' series. Thames & Hudson, 1997, 
 US edition – Heraldry: An Introduction to a Noble Tradition, "Abrams Discoveries" series. Harry N. Abrams, 1997, 
 Dictionnaire des couleurs de notre temps, Bonneton, Paris, 1992
 L'étoffe du diable: une histoire des rayures et des tissus rayés, éditions du Seuil,  1991
 La vie quotidienne en France et en Angleterre au temps des chevaliers de la Table ronde, Hachette 1991, 
 L'hermine et le sinople, études d'héraldique médiévale, Le Léopard d'or, Paris, 1982, 
 Le Cochon : Histoire d'un cousin mal aimé, collection « Découvertes Gallimard » (nº 545), série Culture et société, 2009,

In English translation
Yellow: A History of a Color (Princeton 2019), 
Red: The History of a Color (Princeton 2016), 
Green: The History of a Color (Princeton 2014), 
The Bear: History of a Fallen King (Harvard 2011), 
Black: The History of a Color (Princeton 2008), 
Blue: The History of a Color (Princeton 2001), 
The Devil's Cloth: A History of Stripes (Columbia 2001), 
The Bible and the Saints, with Gaston Duchet-Suchaux (Flammarion 1994),

External links
French National Library
University of Lausanne: speech honouring Pastoureau 
La Société française d'héraldique et de sigillographie 
École nationale des chartes 
Translated and adapted from the French Wikipedia article in September 2006

Writers from Paris
1947 births
Living people
University of Lausanne alumni
French medievalists
French heraldists
University of Paris alumni
École Nationale des Chartes alumni
Academic staff of the École Nationale des Chartes
Commandeurs of the Ordre des Arts et des Lettres
Corresponding members of the Académie des Inscriptions et Belles-Lettres
Academic staff of the University of Paris
French art historians
Prix Médicis essai winners
Prix Roger Caillois recipients
Winners of the Prix Broquette-Gonin (literature)